Hamburg is a city in Carver County, Minnesota, United States. The population was 513 at the 2010 census.

History
A post office has been in operation in Hamburg since 1881. The city was named after Hamburg, in Germany.

Geography

County Road 50 serves as a main route in Hamburg.  Minnesota State Highways 5 and 25 pass in  proximity to the city.

Demographics

2010 census
As of the census of 2010, there were 513 people, 201 households, and 134 families residing in the city. The racial makeup of the city was 94.9% White, 0.2% Native American, 0.2% Asian, 0.2% Pacific Islander, and 4.5% from other races. Hispanic or Latino of any race were 7.0% of the population.

There were 201 households, of which 31.3% had children under the age of 18 living with them, 56.2% were married couples living together, 6.0% had a female householder with no husband present, 4.5% had a male householder with no wife present, and 33.3% were non-families. 24.4% of all households were made up of individuals, and 9% had someone living alone who was 65 years of age or older. The average household size was 2.55 and the average family size was 3.09.

The median age in the city was 38.3 years. 24% of residents were under the age of 18; 8.3% were between the ages of 18 and 24; 28.1% were from 25 to 44; 26.1% were from 45 to 64; and 13.5% were 65 years of age or older. The gender makeup of the city was 52.2% male and 47.8% female.

2000 census
As of the census of 2000, there were 538 people, 206 households, and 159 families residing in the city. The racial makeup of the city was 98.51% White, 0.19% African American, 0.19% Native American, 0.19% Pacific Islander, 0.74% from other races, and 0.19% from two or more races. Hispanic or Latino of any race were 2.42% of the population.

There were 206 households, out of which 35.0% had children under the age of 18 living with them, 66.5% were married couples living together, 7.8% had a female householder with no husband present, and 22.8% were non-families. 19.9% of all households were made up of individuals, and 9.2% had someone living alone who was 65 years of age or older. The average household size was 2.61 and the average family size was 2.99.

In the city, the population was spread out, with 24.9% under the age of 18, 8.2% from 18 to 24, 29.0% from 25 to 44, 22.5% from 45 to 64, and 15.4% who were 65 years of age or older. The median age was 37 years. For every 100 females, there were 100.0 males. For every 100 females age 18 and over, there were 102.0 males.

The median income for a household in the city was $47,578, and the median income for a family was $50,673. Males had a median income of $37,250 versus $28,542 for females. The per capita income for the city was $21,221. About 4.8% of families and 5.6% of the population were below the poverty line, including 3.5% of those under age 18 and 15.6% of those age 65 or over.

Politics

Notable person
Buck Zumhofe, professional wrestler

References

Cities in Carver County, Minnesota
Cities in Minnesota